Renée Bordereau (1776 in Soulaines-sur-Aubance – 1822 in Vezins, Maine-et-Loire), nicknamed The Angevin, was a French woman who followed her father, disguised herself as a man, and fought as a Royalist cavalier in the troops of Charles Melchior Artus de Bonchamps during the Vendéan insurrection against the French Revolution (in 1793) and took part in all battles of the war.

She was born to peasant family south of Angers, France. She may have done some smuggling during her youth, carrying illegal salt between Maine and Brittany.

Her father was part of the riots of the Revolution and as result, was later executed by revolutionaries in December 1793.

She is reputed to have killed some twenty of the opposing revolutionary Bleues including slitting the neck of her own uncle who was a republican. A unit led by her threw six hundred Republican soldiers from the heights of Roche-de-Mûrs in the commune of Mûrs-Erigné, south of the town of Angers, Pays de la Loire, into the Louet River below.

Her effectiveness as a soldier is attested by independent sources, including Madame de La Rochejaquelein, who reported "She was of ordinary height and very ugly. One day at Cholet, they pointed her out to me. 'See that soldier who has sleeves of a color different from his coat. That's a girl who fights like a lion.'... Her unbelievable courage was celebrated throughout the whole army."

On one of her own experiences, Bordereau wrote: "Arriving near the Loire, I destroyed five of my enemies, and finishing off the day, I broke my sword on the head of the last one... Seeing only one horseman near me, I doubled back to our army.  I alone, killed twenty-one that day. I'm not the one who counted them, but those who followed me, and if they hadn't said so, I wouldn't have spoken about it myself."

Quotes
"Renée Bordereau, whose father was butchered before her eyes, and who lost forty-two relatives in the civil war of La Vendee; during the course of six years fought in more than two hundred battles, on foot and on horseback, with the most determined intrepidity. In one battle she killed twenty-one of the enemy. She liberated fifty priests at one time and eight hundred at another, all of whom would have been executed. A price of 40,000 francs was set on her head. She was thrown into prison for a crime for which she could only prove her innocence by a discovery of her sex, where she remained five years, until the accession of Louis Eighteenth to the throne of France."

References

 James Bogle, Vendee Catholics During the French Revolution
 Renée Bordereau, Mémoires de Renée Bordereau dite Langewin, NIORT, 1888.
 Charles Gilbert, Brave l'Angevin ; ou La véritable histoire de Renée Bordereau, cavalier de l'Armée catholique et royale de 1793, Éditions le Cercle d'Or.
 Leah Marie Brown, Silence in the Mist: A Novel of the French Revolution, Eternal Press, 2011.  

1770 births
1824 deaths
People from Maine-et-Loire
Female wartime cross-dressers
Royalist insurgents during the French Revolution
Military personnel of the War in the Vendée
Women in war in France
French counter-revolutionaries
18th-century French memoirists